Brian S. Kim is  the Sol wand Clara Kest Professor, Vice Chair of Research, and Site Chair of Mount Sinai West and Morningside in the Kimberly and Eric J. Waldman Department of Dermatology at Icahn School of Medicine at Mount Sinai. He is also Director of the Mark Lebwohl Center for Neuroinflammation and Sensation.

Education
Dr. Kim received his B.S. in chemistry with honors from Haverford College in 2001 and his M.D. from the University of Washington in 2007. He was a Howard Hughes Medical Institute-National Institutes of Health Research Scholar under Dr. Stephen I. Katz, and completed his residency in dermatology at the Perelman School of Medicine at the University of Pennsylvania. He completed a postdoctoral fellowship under Dr. David Artis, leading to a Master of Translational Research.

Research
Dr. Kim’s laboratory. focuses on the regulatory mechanisms that underlie skin inflammation and the sensation of itch as a model paradigm of neuroimmunology. Key discoveries include the first identification of group 2 innate lymphoid cells (ILC2s) in the skin of both mice and humans, novel contributions of basophils, ILC2s, and natural killer (NK) cells to skin inflammation, and unveiling how different innate immune cells and type 2 cytokines/JAK signaling directly influence sensory neuronal responses.

He was the first to identify IL-4 receptor signaling on sensory neurons, which critically informed new therapies like dupilumab. Dr. Kim's group also was the first lab to identify JAK1 signaling in sensory neurons, building on previous research which showed a significant reduction of itch symptoms in response to treatment with JAK inhibitors. While these previous works investigated JAK inhibition as an anti-inflammatory treatment, Dr. Kim and colleagues found that disruption of neuronal JAK1 signaling limits both inflammatory and non-inflammatory itch, suggesting that JAK inhibitors may represent a novel neuromodulatory approach to target itch in atopic dermatitis Dr. Kim also designed the pivotal phase 2 clinical trial that ultimately led to the approval of topical ruxolitinib for atopic dermatitis.

His research in neuroimmune regulation of itch and atopic dermatitis has led to awards and funding from the NIH, Doris Duke Charitable Foundation, American Skin Association, American Academy of Dermatology (2014 Young Investigator Award), American Society for Clinical Investigation, American Dermatological Association, and International League of Dermatological Societies. He holds a patent for the use of JAK inhibitors for chronic itch. He is on the scientific advisory board for Abrax Japan, Granular Therapeutics, Recens Medical, National Eczema Association, and Cell Reports Medicine. He is section editor for Journal of Immunology and on the board of reviewing editors for eLife and Journal of Allergy and Clinical Immunology.

References 

Living people
Haverford College alumni
21st-century American educators
Icahn School of Medicine at Mount Sinai faculty
University of Washington School of Medicine alumni
American medical academics
American medical researchers
Year of birth missing (living people)